Sayce is a surname, and may refer to:

Archibald Sayce (1846–1933), British linguist and Assyriologist
Conrad Sayce, Australian architect and author
Lynda Sayce, British musician
Philip Sayce (born 1976), Canadian musician
Richard Sayce (1917–1977), British academic in French literature